Mandaue is a city in the province of Cebu in the Philippines. In pre-Hispanic times it was ruled by a chieftain, Aponoaan, who gave tribute to the Spanish. A later chief was Lambusan but after the arrival of the Spaniards, the Jesuit priests were given authority. Local leaders during the Spanish regime were  Capitanes, Tenientes and the Cabeza de Barangay. In the American commonwealth era of the Philippines the leaders were the El Presidentes of Mandaue. In 1943, after the war, the title was changed to Mayor. 

Alejandro Fortuna was the final leader with the title of El Presidente of Mandaue. He was succeeded by Ariston Cortes who had the new title of Mayor of the Town of Mandaue.

References

Politics of Mandaue